The Gauteng Department of Education (GDE) is the department of the Government of Gauteng responsible for primary and secondary education within the Gauteng Province of South Africa. The Member of the Executive Council for this department is Matome Chiloane, while the head of the department is Edward Mosuwe.

The department was established in 1994 to replace the education department of the dissolved Transvaal Province. The department is headquartered at 117 Simmonds Street in Marshalltown, Johannesburg.

More recently, the department has been criticised for not being able to accommodate the growing number of pupils in the province. It has attempted to use an online registration system, but, this too has been criticised.

For the 2018/2019 financial year, it received a financially unqualified audit and recorded irregular expenditure of over R1,2 billion. Irregular expenditure for the 2019/2020 financial year once again topped R1 billion, while R431 million was spent in three months to disinfect schools. The Democratic Alliance cited these expenses as proof that the department is unable to manage its finances.

References

External links
Gauteng Department: Education
Official website

Government of Gauteng
Gauteng